Clement John Zablocki (November 18, 1912December 3, 1983) was an American politician who served nearly 35 years in the United States House of Representatives, representing Wisconsin's 4th congressional district.

A liberal Democrat, he built his reputation in foreign policy by taking strong anticommunist positions and supporting the Vietnam War. He rose to become chairman of the House Foreign Affairs Committee for the last six years of his career.

Career
Zablocki was born in Milwaukee, Wisconsin, and graduated from Milwaukee's Marquette University. Zablocki was elected to the Wisconsin State Senate in 1942, at age 30, representing the 3rd senatorial district.  He served one full four-year term and was re-elected in 1946.

Tenure in Congress
In 1948, he challenged incumbent Republican congressman John C. Brophy, who had been narrowly elected in a three-way race in 1946.  Zablocki faced no opposition in the Democratic primary, and defeated Brophy in the general election, carrying 55% of the vote.  He was sworn in as the representative of Wisconsin's 4th congressional district for the 81st United States Congress and was subsequently reelected 17 times, serving from January 3, 1949, until his death from a heart attack on December 3, 1983. Zablocki was the chairman of the House Foreign Affairs Committee from 1977 until his death in 1983.  He served during the presidencies of Jimmy Carter and Ronald Reagan, a period that included several significant international events, including the Iran hostage crisis. Zablocki introduced the Taiwan Relations Act on February 28, 1979.

 
Zablocki was a co-author of the Case-Zablocki Act of 1972 which required that executive agreements by the president be reported to Congress in 60 days. He helped design an early version of the War Powers Act from 1970 to 1972, which put presidential war-making power under congressional control. He was instrumental in House passage of the final version in late 1973 over President Nixon's veto.<ref>Eleanor W  Schoenebaum, ed., Political Profiles: The Nixon/Ford Years (1979) p 688</ref>

An advocate for the interests of Vietnam War prisoners of war and missing in action, Zablocki during May 1973 hearings observed that returning prisoners uniformly had expressed their belief that there were no U.S. servicemen still alive in Vietnam.

Personal life
Zablocki was buried at St. Adalbert's Cemetery in Milwaukee.

Clement J. Zablocki Veterans Affairs Medical Center at 5000 West National Avenue in Milwaukee is named for him, as is the Zablocki Library and the Clement J. Zablocki Elementary School in Milwaukee.

Electoral history

Wisconsin Senate (1942, 1946)

| colspan="6" style="text-align:center;background-color: #e9e9e9;"| Democratic Primary, September 1942

| colspan="6" style="text-align:center;background-color: #e9e9e9;"| General Election, November 3, 1942

| colspan="6" style="text-align:center;background-color: #e9e9e9;"| Democratic Primary, August 13, 1946

| colspan="6" style="text-align:center;background-color: #e9e9e9;"| General Election, November 5, 1946

U.S. House of Representatives (1948–1982)

 Further reading
 Barone, Michael et al. The Almanac of American Politics: 1976 (1975)  pp 930–32
 Leahy, Stephen M.  The Life of Milwaukee's Most Popular Politician, Clement J. Zablocki: Milwaukee Politics and Congressional Foreign Policy. Lewiston, NY: The Edward Mellen Press, 2002.

 See also 
 List of United States Congress members who died in office (1950–99)

 References 

Further reading
 Leahy, Stephen M. The Life of Milwaukee's Most Popular Politician, Clement J. Zablocki: Milwaukee Politics and Congressional Foreign Policy'' (Edwin Mellen Press, 2002).

External links 

 Clement J. Zablocki Papers at Marquette University.
 Clement J. Zablocki, Photographs of Wisconsin’s “Mr. Democrat” at Marquette University.
 
 

1912 births
1983 deaths
Democratic Party Wisconsin state senators
Politicians from Milwaukee
American politicians of Polish descent
Marquette University alumni
Democratic Party members of the United States House of Representatives from Wisconsin
20th-century American politicians